Jakubec (feminine Jakubcová) is a Czech and Slovak surname that may refer to the following notable people:
 Branislav Jakubec (born 1967), Slovak wheelchair curler
 Doris Jakubec, professor of Suisse romande literature
 František Jakubec (1956–2016), Czech football player

Czech-language surnames